Peter Konyegwachie (MON born 26 November 1965 in Lagos) was a Nigerian boxer. He hails from Ogwashi-Uku. The town that also produced another sport (football) great, Austin "Jay Jay" Okocha.The town is the headquarters of Aniocha South Local Government Area of Delta State, Nigeria. He attended Adaigbo Secondary School. At the 1984 Summer Olympics he won Nigeria's first ever silver medal in the men's Featherweight (54–57 kg) category.

Konyegwachie became professional in 1986 and won his first 15 fights prior to getting stopped by a journeyman in 1990.  He retired after the bout at 15-1-0.

External links
 

1965 births
Living people
Featherweight boxers
Olympic boxers of Nigeria
Boxers at the 1984 Summer Olympics
Olympic silver medalists for Nigeria
Boxers at the 1982 Commonwealth Games
Commonwealth Games gold medallists for Nigeria
Olympic medalists in boxing
Nigerian male boxers
Medalists at the 1984 Summer Olympics
Commonwealth Games medallists in boxing
Sportspeople from Lagos
20th-century Nigerian people
21st-century Nigerian people
Medallists at the 1982 Commonwealth Games